Anna Marie Quindlen (born July 8, 1952) is an American author, journalist, and opinion columnist.

Her New York Times column, Public and Private, won the Pulitzer Prize for Commentary in 1992. She began her journalism career in 1974 as a reporter for the New York Post.  Between 1977 and 1994 she held several posts at The New York Times. Her semi-autobiographical novel One True Thing (1994) served as the basis for the 1998 film starring Meryl Streep and Renée Zellweger.

Life and career

Anna Quindlen was born in Philadelphia, Pennsylvania, on July 8, 1953, the daughter of Prudence (née Pantano, 1928–1972) and Robert Quindlen. Her father was Irish American and her mother was Italian American. Quindlen graduated in 1970 from South Brunswick High School in South Brunswick, New Jersey, and then attended Barnard College, from which she graduated in 1974. She was married to New Jersey attorney Gerald Krovatin, whom she met while in college. Their sons Quindlen Krovatin and Christopher Krovatin are published authors, and daughter Maria is an actress, comedian and writer.

Anna Quindlen left journalism in 1995 to become a full-time novelist.

In 1999, she joined Newsweek, writing a bi-weekly column until she announced her semi-retirement in the May 18, 2009, issue of the magazine. Quindlen is known as a critic of what she perceives to be the fast-paced and increasingly materialistic nature of modern American life. Much of her personal writing centers on her mother, who died  from ovarian cancer, when Quindlen was 19 years old.

She has written nine novels, several of which have been adapted into motion pictures. One True Thing was made into a feature film in 1998. It starred Meryl Streep, who received an Academy Award nomination for Best Actress for the role. Black and Blue and Blessings were made into television movies in 1999 and 2003, respectively.

Quindlen participates in LearnedLeague under the name "QuindlenA”.

One True Thing
In 1994, her semi-autobiographical novel, titled One True Thing, was published. The book focuses on the relationship between a young woman and her mother, who is dying from cancer. Quindlen's own mother, Prudence Quindlen, died in 1972 while in her 40s from ovarian cancer. At the time Quindlen was a college student, but came home to take care of her mother. In 1998, a film of the same name was released. The movie starred Meryl Streep and Renée Zellweger as Kate and Ellen Gulden, fictionalized versions of Prudence and Anna Quindlen. Streep was nominated for the Academy Award for Best Actress for her performance.

Criticism
Writing in The New Republic, critic Lee Siegel cited Quindlen as an example of the “monsters of empathy” who “self subjugate and domesticate and assimilate every distant tragedy”. He coined the term “The Quindlen Effect” to describe this phenomenon and suggested that it began with her Times column of December 13, 1992, in which Quindlen assailed the four alleged perpetrators of the Glen Ridge rape. “True to her niche,” Siegel wrote, “Quindlen attacked with scathing indignation actions that no sane Times reader would ever defend.” Siegel also referred to Barbara Kingsolver in the same essay, along with Quindlen, derisively as “Nice Queens”.

In 1999, Villanova University invited Anna Quindlen to deliver the annual commencement address. But once the announcement was made, a group of anti-abortion students planned a protest against Quindlen's positions on reproductive rights, and she withdrew as speaker. The following year, however, she spoke at Villanova's graduation.

Works

Nonfiction

A Quilt of a Country* (2001)
Living Out Loud (1988)
Thinking Out Loud (1994)
How Reading Changed My Life (1998)
Homeless (1998)
A Short Guide to a Happy Life (2000)   from part of a cancelled commencement address that was to be given at Villanova
Loud and Clear (2004)
Imagined London (2004)
Being Perfect (2005)
Good Dog. Stay. (2007)
Lots of Candles, Plenty of Cake  (2012)
Nanaville: Adventures in Grandparenting (2019)
Write for Your LIfe (2022)

Novels
Object Lessons (1991)
One True Thing (1994)
Black and Blue (1998)
Blessings (2002)
Rise and Shine (2006)
Every Last One: A Novel (2010)
Still Life with Bread Crumbs (2013)
Miller's Valley (2016)
Alternate Side (2018)

Children's books
The Tree That Came To Stay (Illustrated by Nancy Carpenter) (1992)
Happily Ever After (Illustrated by James Stevenson) (1997)

New table pictorials
Naked Babies (Photographs by Nick Kelsh) (1996)
Siblings (Photographs by Nick Kelsh) (1998)

Speeches
 1999 commencement speech, Mount Holyoke College
 2000 commencement speech, Villanova University
 2002 commencement speech, Sarah Lawrence College
 2006 commencement speech, Colby College
 2008 commencement speech, Kenyon College
 2009 commencement speech, Wesleyan University
 2011 commencement speech, Grinnell College
 2017 commencement speech, Washington University in St. Louis

Awards

Industry awards 
 1992 Pulitzer Prize for Commentary
 2001 Mothers At Home Media Award
 2001 Clarion Award for Best Regular Opinion Column in a magazine
 2002 Clarion Award for Best Opinion Column from the Association for Women in Communications

Honorary degrees 
 Colby College
 Dartmouth College
 Denison University
 Grinnell College, May 2011
 Hamilton College, May 2006
 Kenyon College, May 2008
 Moravian College
 Mount Holyoke College
 Nantucket High School
 Penn State
 Sarah Lawrence College
 Smith College
 Springfield College, May 2018
 Stevens Institute of Technology
 Villanova University
 Washington University in St. Louis
 Wesleyan University

Other awards from universities 
 University Medal of Excellence from Columbia
 Poynter Fellow in Journalism at Yale
 Victoria Fellow in Contemporary Issues at Rutgers
 Fellow of the American Academy of Arts and Sciences
 Honorary Doctorate from The Pennsylvania State University (Aug.18 2007)
 Honorary Doctor of Humane Letters Degree from Washington University in St. Louis. (pending for 2017)

Other awards 
 2006 Amelia Earhart Award from Crittenton Women's Union
 2016 inductee into the New Jersey Hall of Fame

References

External links 

 Anna Quindlen at Random House
 
 Anna Quindlen's columns for Newsweek
 Anna Quindlen talks about her novel Rise and Shine video
 
 Interview on NPR in April 2012

1952 births
20th-century American novelists
21st-century American novelists
American children's writers
American columnists
American women novelists
Barnard College alumni
Wesleyan University people
American people of Irish descent
American writers of Italian descent
Living people
Newsweek people
Writers from Manhattan
People from South Brunswick, New Jersey
South Brunswick High School (New Jersey) alumni
Pulitzer Prize for Commentary winners
Writers from Philadelphia
The New York Times columnists
American women columnists
Writers from New Jersey
American women children's writers
20th-century American women writers
21st-century American women writers
Novelists from New York (state)
Novelists from Pennsylvania
20th-century American non-fiction writers
21st-century American non-fiction writers